Sangestan (also Romanized as Sangestān) is a village in Kuhpayeh Rural District, Nowbaran District, Saveh County, Markazi Province, Iran. At the 2006 census, its population was 36, in 16 families.

References 

Populated places in Saveh County